QFB may refer to:

 Ratchet & Clank Future: Quest for Booty, the eighth game in the Ratchet & Clank video game series
 Freiburg Hauptbahnhof, Freiburg, Germany railway station (IATA airport code)